Charles W. Baker Airport  is a civil, publicly owned airport. It is located four miles (6 km) southwest of the central business district of Millington, a city in Shelby County, Tennessee, United States. It is 10 miles (16km) from downtown Memphis. It is owned and operated by Memphis - Shelby County Airport Authority. It also immediately adjacent to Memphis International Raceway.

History
The airfield was originally built during World War II as an outlying landing field (OLF) to Naval Air Station Memphis and consisted of eight 1600 foot paved runways arranged in a Star of David pattern.  Considered surplus at the end of the war, the OLF was released to civilian control in 1946.  Charles W. Baker Airport opened in 1959, and has also been known in the past as "Shelby County Airport".

Facilities and aircraft 
Charles W. Baker Airport is on a  plot of land. It has an additional asphalt runway 18U/36U designed solely for ultra-light aircraft that is 1,600 x 75 feet (487.7 x 28.7 m). 

Charles W. Baker airport offers 100LL and Jet-A fuels from its FBO. Charles W Baker has a terminal that includes a pilot's lounge and a meeting room. The FBO also provides access to car rental via Enterprise Rent-A-Car.

Airlines and destinations
Shelby Charters is based out of Charles W Baker airport. They transport both passengers and cargo on demand. They have two Beech 55s and a Cessna C-401A. 

Other traffic includes ultra-light aircraft and general aviation aircraft.

No regular service operates to or from Charles W. Baker Airport.

References

External links

Airports in Tennessee
Buildings and structures in Shelby County, Tennessee
Transportation in Memphis, Tennessee
Transportation in Shelby County, Tennessee
1959 establishments in Tennessee
Airports established in 1959